María Julia Hernández (January 30, 1939 – March 30, 2007) was a prominent human rights advocate who tried to speak for victims of the civil war in El Salvador. She was the founding director of Tutela Legal, the human rights office of the Roman Catholic Archdiocese of San Salvador.

Hernández was born in San Francisco Morazán, Honduras, to Salvadoran parents. Her family returned to El Salvador shortly after her birth. She never married but dedicated her life to the Catholic Church and its work among the people of El Salvador.

She spent 30 years gathering evidence of massacres and individual killings, interviewing survivors, seeing that they stayed alive and compiling a book of the dead.  The book of the dead grew into more of an encyclopedia of political violence.

Hernández did her work in a sparsely furnished room decorated by a cross and two photographs of Archbishop Óscar Romero, the church leader who was assassinated in 1980 by right-wing forces in El Salvador. Romero was killed while celebrating Mass, after calling upon the army to stop the death squads who were attacking real and imagined opponents of the status quo.

The killing of the archbishop was among the opening shots of the civil war that lasted until 1992. It was a central event in the life of María Julia Hernández. Hernández worked with Romero, who was installed as bishop in 1977, at the start of a 15-year wave of violence that pitted a relative handful of left-wing guerillas against the ruling class, the armed forces and the government of El Salvador. Most of the 75,000 victims of the violence were peasants who were killed while passively resisting the powers of the state.

In 1991 Hernández was awarded the Pacem in Terris Award. It was named after a 1963 encyclical letter by Pope John XXIII that calls upon all people of good will to secure peace among all nations (Pacem in terris is Latin for 'Peace on Earth'.)

María Julia Hernández died on March 30, 2007, of a heart attack in San Salvador at the age of 68.

See also
José Castellanos Contreras
Marina Manzanares Monjarás

External links
Washington Post: Human Rights Activist Maria Julia Hernandez dies
New York Times: María Julia Hernández, 68, Rights Advocate in El Salvador, Dies
The Economist: María Julia Hernández obituary

References 

1939 births
2007 deaths
Roman Catholic activists
Salvadoran Roman Catholics
Salvadoran human rights activists
Honduran human rights activists
Women human rights activists
Honduran women activists
Honduran Roman Catholics